Shraddha Rehabilitation Foundation is Non-profit organisation established by Dr Bharat Vatwani, a Mumbai-based Psychiatrist, in 1988. Based in Karjat, Maharashtra, the foundation aims to find, restore and reunite, the mentally ill destitutes back with their families.

History
In 1988, the psychiatrists Dr Bharat vatwani and Smitha Vatwani decided to start a Rehabilitation home for mentally ill destitutes wandering on the streets. As Bharat quoted in a newspaper article,"I was so moved by the plight of this boy that I decided to take care of him. After treating the boy, I was shocked to learn of his identity. He was a BSc graduate with a diploma in medical laboratory technology and his father was a superintendent in Andhra Pradesh".

Work
So far more than 8000 destitutes have been reunited since the inception of the organisation. The foundation joins hands with various individuals and Corporates such as ValueLabs to achieve the goal.

References

External links 
 

Non-profit organisations based in India
Mental health organisations in India
1989 establishments in Maharashtra
Organizations established in 1989